Khan Arnabah (also spelt Khan Arnabeh) is a town in southern Syria, administratively part of the Quneitra Governorate (Golan Heights), in the portion of the province still under Syrian control. The town is located just outside the United Nations Disengagement Observer Force Zone. Nearby localities include Sa'sa' to the northeast, Quneitra to the southwest, Jubata al-Khashab to the northwest, as well as the Circassian villages of Beer Ajam and Bariqa to the south. According to the Syria Central Bureau of Statistics, Khan Arnabah had a population of 7,375 in the 2004 census. The town is also the administrative centre of the Khan Arnabah nahiyah, which is made up of 19 towns having a combined population of 42,980.

References

External links
 Qnaitra-map 19 K

Towns in Quneitra Governorate